The Voice Sverige (The Voice Sweden) is the Swedish version of the singing competition  The Voice of Holland. The Voice Sweden premiered in early January 2012 with its first season. The host was Carina Berg and judges were the singers Carola Häggkvist, Magnus Uggla, Ola Salo and rapper Petter. In January 2013, TV4 announced that Idol, another singing talent show seeking to discover the best singer through nationwide auditions, would return in 2013 and that The Voice Sverige would not continue.

Series overview

References

Swedish music television series
Sverige
TV4 (Sweden) original programming
2012 Swedish television series debuts